The Meyboom plantation (or Meiboom in Dutch, "May tree" – a bastardisation of the Dutch tree of joy) is the oldest tradition in Brussels, Belgium, attested since 1308. It is held every year on 9 August, the eve of St Lawrence's Day, and consists mainly in planting a beech at the intersection of the / and the / in the City of Brussels' Marais–Jacqmain District. It is accompanied by processions and various folk activities during the day.

The celebration is reminiscent of Brussels' long-standing (folkloric) feud with Leuven, which dates back to the Middle Ages. Following a friendly incident in 1974 in which the Meyboom was stolen and brought to Leuven, both cities have claimed to be planting the "real" Meyboom. Since 2008, it is recognised as a Masterpiece of the Oral and Intangible Heritage of Humanity by UNESCO.

History
According to tradition, the celebration commemorates a victory of Brussels over the nearby Flemish town of Leuven in 1213. The Companions of St Lawrence, a city guild, came to the aid of Brussels' inhabitants and vigorously repelled the aggressor. Grateful, the Duke of Brabant at the time (Henri I of Brabant), granted the status of corporation to the guild and gave it the right to plant henceforth a tree of joy or Meyboom. In honour of the new corporation, the date of the plantation was fixed to 9 August, the eve of St Lawrence's Day, the guild's patron saint.

In spite of Brussels' tortuous history, including the 20th-century demolition of most of the Marais–Jacqmain District, the Meyboom tradition has been maintained throughout the centuries. An incident happened, however, in 1974, when a group of men from Leuven, called The Men Of 1929, managed to find out which tree Brussels had earmarked as their Meyboom. During the night of 8 August, they cut down the tree and transported it to Leuven, where they planted it in front of the city hall. Brussels chose to ignore what had happened and cut down another tree. Ever since, the two cities have been involved in a friendly rivalry to decide who has the "real" Meyboom.

Since 2008, the Meyboom has been recognised as a Masterpiece of the Oral and Intangible Heritage of Humanity by UNESCO, as part of the binational listing of 'Processional giants and dragons in Belgium and France'.

Celebrations
The tree is designated by the city's Plantation Department and "chosen" by the Companions of St Lawrence in the Sonian Forest, in the outskirts of Brussels. According to tradition, it must weigh at least , measure  in height and be leafy. It is cut and then transported by Bûûmdroegers ("tree bearers") through the municipalities of Schaerbeek, Saint-Josse-ten-Noode and the City of Brussels. The procession is accompanied by a marching band, Poepedroegers ("giant puppet bearers"), the Wheel of Fortune, Kêrstoempers ("cart pushers"), Meybloemekes ("flower-handing women"), as well as Gardevils ("city guards") since 2001. At 1 p.m., a tribute is paid to the deceased Companions.

The procession then forms at the corner of the / and the / (near the local brotherhood of the Companions, at 37, /), and sets off along a fixed route through the /, the /, the /, the /, the /, the /, the /, the /, before arriving at the Grand-Place/Grote Markt (Brussels' main square). 

At 2.45 p.m., the procession returns from the Grand-Place via the /, the /, the /, the /, the /, and finally returns to the corner of the / and the / around 4.30 p.m. Along the way, small branches of the tree are distributed, supposed to bring good fortune for the year to come. The culmination is the plantation itself, which must take place before 5 p.m. to avoid a victory from the "Louvanistes" (i.e. Leuven's inhabitants). The tree is in fact not really planted but stuck in the ground and removed the next day.

See also

 History of Brussels
 Culture of Belgium
 Ommegang of Brussels
 Royal Theatre Toone
 Saint-Verhaegen

References

Notes

Bibliography
 

Culture in Brussels
History of Brussels
Parades in Belgium
Tourist attractions in Brussels
City of Brussels
Annual events in Brussels
Summer events in Belgium
Belgian folklore